Florence Kirsch Du Brul (1915–July 2, 2005) was a concert pianist and master piano teacher and member of Chicago society in the mid-20th century.

Born on the North Side of Chicago, Illinois, USA, in 1915, Florence Kirsch as a little girl studied with master pianist Silvio Scionti and composer Howard Wells, and performed with the Chicago Symphony Orchestra at age 12. The CSO’s conductor, Frederick Stock, recommended her to the great Austrian classical pianist and composer Artur Schnabel, and Kirsch was sent to Berlin, Germany, where Schnabel was living, so she could study with the great master during her teenage years.

After the Nazis came to power, Kirsch was denied permission to leave Germany, and so was forced to escape to Italy leaving all her possessions behind. She returned to the United States in 1937, and made her professional debut in Chicago’s Orchestra Hall that year.

Kirsch became a classical concert pianist, and performed on several classical records, including neo-classic Swiss composer Ernest Bloch’s Voice in the Wilderness, and Russian composer Igor Stravinsky’s Les Noces.

Living in New York City in the 1940s while performing and teaching, she met and married Dr. E. Lloyd Du Brul, an anatomist, physical anthropologist, and educator. After Dr. Du Brul served in General George Patton’s Third Army in World War II, he received a faculty appointment at the University of Illinois at Chicago College of Dentistry.

The couple purchased a stately 19th century home in Lincoln Park, Chicago and filled it with art, sculpture, native handicrafts, and other memorabilia from their many trips abroad. They threw legendary parties, and the Du Brul home was “a welcoming scientific, artistic, and intellectual haven for some of the finest minds of the 20th century,” said Dr. Bruce S. Graham, Dean of the College.

“To dine at the Du Bruls’ home was a feast for the palate and for the eyes in the presentation of dinner,” said Dr. Thomas Lakars, Assistant Professor of Oral Biology. “To have visited the Du Bruls’ home for a garden party or for dinner at their banquet table was a treat never to be forgotten.”

Throughout her life, Mrs. Du Brul traveled around the world lecturing about piano and teaching master classes, where she collaborated with and/or taught several notable pianists, such as Lucia Barrenechea of Brazil and the late Donald Walker, Professor of Piano at Northern Illinois University. Even in her later years, Mrs. Du Brul taught piano at Northwestern University and performed on WFMT-FM Radio in Chicago. At the time of her death, Mrs. Du Brul continued to hold Emeritus Professor status at the Music Institute of Chicago. Mrs. Du Brul also enjoyed gardening and raising standard poodles.

Dr. and Mrs. Du Brul donated their collection of human, animal, and prehistoric skeletal artifacts, prepared for teaching graduate-level oral anatomy, to the  College in 1996. “It’s an absolutely amazing collection,” said Dr. Anne Grauer of the Loyola University Chicago Department of Anthropology. “An outstanding resource for teaching and research.”
In 2004, the College dedicated a new Du Brul Archives of Oral Anatomy to house the collection.

Florence Kirsch Du Brul died on July 2, 2005.

External links
Chicago Tribune obituary

1915 births
2005 deaths
American expatriates in Germany
Musicians from Chicago
20th-century American pianists
American classical pianists
American women classical pianists
20th-century American women pianists
Classical musicians from Illinois
21st-century American women